A telomere is a region of repetitive nucleotide sequences at each end of a chromosome.

Telomere may also refer to:

Telomere (insect morphology), a type of genital clasper
Telomere resolvase, an enzyme found in bacteria which contain linear plasmids.

See also
 Telomerization